Universidad Panamericana de Guatemala is a university in Zone 16 of Guatemala City.

References

External links
Official site 

Universities in Guatemala City